British-American filmmaker Christopher Nolan has received many awards and honours throughout his career. He has been nominated for five Academy Awards, five British Academy Film Awards and five Golden Globe Awards. He was appointed Commander of the Order of the British Empire (CBE) in the 2019 New Year Honours for his services to film.

At the 2001 Sundance Film Festival, Nolan and his brother Jonathan won the Waldo Salt Screenwriting Award for Memento, and in 2003 Nolan received the Sonny Bono Visionary Award from the Palm Springs International Film Festival. Festival executive director Mitch Levine said, "Nolan had in his brief time as a feature film director, redefined and advanced the very language of cinema". He was named an Honorary Fellow of UCL in 2006, and conferred an honorary doctorate in literature (DLit) in 2017. In 2009, the director received the Board of the Governors Award from the American Society of Cinematographers. In 2011 Nolan received the Britannia Award for Artistic Excellence in Directing from the British Academy of Film and Television Arts and the ACE Golden Eddie Filmmaker of the Year Award from American Cinema Editors. That year he also received the Modern Master Award, the highest honour presented by the Santa Barbara International Film Festival. In addition, Nolan was the recipient of the inaugural VES Visionary Award from the Visual Effects Society.

In 2012 he became the youngest director to be honoured with a hand-and-footprint ceremony at Grauman's Chinese Theatre in Los Angeles. Nolan received the first-ever Founder's Award from Slamdance Film Festival in 2014. The Art Directors Guild selected Nolan as the recipient of its Cinematic Imagery Award in 2015, an honour bestowed upon those whose body of work has "richly enhanced the visual aspects of the movie-going experience". He was selected as the 2015 Class Day speaker at Princeton University and was awarded the Empire Inspiration Award at the 20th Empire Awards. In the following years he received the FIAF Award from the archival community, and the inaugural Vanguard Award from The Digital Entertainment Group. The director has been honoured with career retrospectives at the Walker Art Center and Institut Lumière.

Awards and nominations

See also 
 List of accolades received by The Dark Knight
 List of accolades received by Inception
 List of accolades received by Interstellar
 List of accolades received by Dunkirk

References

Notes

Sources

External links 
 List of awards and nominations at the Internet Movie Database

Lists of awards received by film director
Christopher Nolan